Samaritan source (⅏) is a symbol used in classical studies to indicate that a referenced textual source is written with the Samaritan script.

References

Samaritan culture and history